Carl Heumann (19 March 1886 – 5 March 1945) was a German art collector persecuted by the Nazis because of his Jewish origins.

Early life 
Carl Heumann was born on 19 March 1886 in Cologne to Jewish parents. He converted to Protestantism in 1917 when he met and married Irmgard, who was a Protestant.  He was a banker  at Bankhaus Bayer & Heintze and consul in Chemnitz.

Art collector 
As an art collector, work hard, he was interested in German art of the Romantic period. He collected drawings by German and Austrian artists from the 18th and 19th centuries.

Persecution under the Nazis 
In 1938, Heumann was economically ruined by the Nazi's racial persecution: forced out of his own banking house, he had to pay the "Judenvermögensabgabe" and was no longer allowed to manage his own financial affairs, as a "Sicherungsanordnung" had been issued over his assets. Heumann was regarded by the Nazis as a ”full Jew.” At first he was protected by his mixed marriage. After the death of his non-Jewish wife Irmgard in January 1944, his protection ceased. He was forced to sell artworks, including three Fendi and Gensler prints, to ensure the family's livelihood.

Death 
Heumann was killed in a bombing raid in Chemnitz on 5 March 1945. Two of his children went to the USA after the Second World War, where many of his descendants live today.

Legacy: provenance research and restitutions 
Several German museums are researching Heumann. In recognition of his persecution, the Kupferstich-Kabinett der Staatlichen Kunstsammlungen Dresden, the Stiftung Preußischer Kulturbesitz in Berlin and the Städtische Galerie im Lenbachhaus und Kunstbau München, among others, approached Carl Heumann's descendants in order to find a just and fair solution regarding the artworks from his collection.

In 2020, the Staatlichen Kunstsammlungen Dresden (SKD) restituted three graphic works from the Kupferstich-Kabinett to Heumann's family.

For "Provenance Research Day" on 14 April 2021 Heumann's granddaughter, Carol Heumann Snider, talked with provenance researchers Dr. Katja Lindenau (Staatliche Kunstsammlungen Dresden) and Melanie Wittchow (Lenbachhaus),  about her grandfather and her father Thomas Heumann, describing how she preserves their stories and memories for her children and grandchildren.

References 

German art collectors
Jewish art collectors
1886 births
1945 deaths
20th-century German Jews
Subjects of Nazi art appropriations
Art and cultural repatriation after World War II
German civilians killed in World War II
Deaths by airstrike during World War II